Aqeel Rehman (born September 12, 1985) is a professional squash player who represents Austria. He reached a career-high world ranking of World No. 81 in May 2013.

References

External links 
 
 
 

Austrian squash players
Living people
1985 births
Sportspeople from Salzburg